Ceresco is a small unincorporated community in Calhoun County in the U.S. state of Michigan. Ceresco is situated on the Kalamazoo River approximately five miles west of downtown Marshall. Ceresco has a post office with ZIP Code 49033. The ZIP Code area serves portions of west and southwest Marshall Township, southeast Emmett Charter Township, northwest Fredonia Township, and a large portion of Newton Township.

History
In 1838, a saw mill and flour mill were built on the Kalamazoo River at the site of what became Ceresco. Isaac E. Crary and John D. Pierce named the community by combining the name of Ceres, the Roman goddess of growing grains, with the first two letters of "company." The first post office was established on December 30, 1843, with Winslow S. Hale as the first postmaster.

The farming village of Ceresco, Nebraska is named after this place, the home town of Richard Nelson and Hod Andrus, two early settlers in the Nebraska hamlet.

References

Unincorporated communities in Calhoun County, Michigan
Populated places established in 1838
Unincorporated communities in Michigan
1838 establishments in Michigan